Following is a list of senators of Alpes-de-Haute-Provence, people who have represented the department of Alpes-de-Haute-Provence in the Senate of France.
The department was created as Nord-de-Provence on 4 March 1790, subsequently renamed Haute-Provence and then Basses-Alpes.
The department of Basses-Alpes was renamed Alpes-de-Haute-Provence on 13 April 1970.

Third Republic

Senators for Basses-Alpes under the French Third Republic were:

 Césaire du Chaffaut (1876–1884) 
 Joseph Eugène Michel (1876–1885) 
 Jean-Baptiste Bouteille (1885–1893) 
 Marius Soustre (1885–1897) 
 Léonard Richaud (1894–1895) 
 Lazare Fruchier (1895–1903) 
 César Allemand (1897–1903) 
 Louis Andrieux (1903) 
 Hippolyte Gassier (1903–1907) 
 Adolphe Defarge (1903–1910) 
 Camille Pelissier (1907–1912) 
 Henri Michel (1910–1921) 
 Justin Perchot (1912–1911) 
 André Honnorat (1921–1945) 
 Pierre de Courtois (1930–1945)

Fourth Republic

Senators for Basses-Alpes under the French Fourth Republic were:

Fifth Republic 

Senators for Basses-Alpes and then Alpes-de-Haute-Provence under the French Fifth Republic:

References

Sources

Senators of the Alpes-de-Haute-Provence department of France.

 
Lists of members of the Senate (France) by department
People from Alpes-de-Haute-Provence